Nerlin Alexis Membreño Flores (born June 24, 1972 in Tegucigalpa) is a retired Honduran football defender.

Club career
After a lengthy spell at Olimpia and a few seasons at Victoria, Membreño finished his career at Atlético Olanchano in Liga Nacional de Honduras.

International career
Membreño made his debut for Honduras in a May 1991 UNCAF Nations Cup match against Panama and has earned a total of 17 caps, scoring 1 goal. He has represented his country in 5 FIFA World Cup qualification matches and played at the 1991 UNCAF Nations Cup as well as at the 1998 CONCACAF Gold Cup.

His final international was a March 2000 friendly match against Chile.

International goals
Scores and results list Honduras' goal tally first.

Retirement
After quitting his playing career, he became assistant coach at Olimpia.

References

External links

1972 births
Living people
Sportspeople from Tegucigalpa
Association football defenders
Honduran footballers
Honduras international footballers
1998 CONCACAF Gold Cup players
C.D. Olimpia players
C.D. Victoria players
Atlético Olanchano players
Liga Nacional de Fútbol Profesional de Honduras players